"Dua Lipa" is a song by American rapper Jack Harlow from his second studio album Come Home the Kids Miss You (2022). It is named after English-Albanian singer Dua Lipa.

Background
Harlow stated in an interview with The Breakfast Club that he reached out to Dua Lipa via FaceTime to get her permission to release the song, which he played for her, and that he would not have released it if she did not approve. According to Harlow, "But she was like, 'Oh, it's not my song. I suppose it's okay.' She was just kinda thrown off and she just kinda let it go." He added that his conversations with her have been "less awkward" ever since.

The song was also previewed days before it was released on May 6, 2022 as a track from Come Home the Kids Miss You.

Composition
In the song, Jack Harlow raps over a trap beat about his desire to form a relationship with Dua Lipa. In addition, he compares his rise to fame to that of Ariana Grande (also referencing her song "Thank U, Next"), and mentions growing his pectoral muscles (with an acknowledgment to his personal trainer) and collaboration with Kanye West. He also name-drops Dallas Mavericks NBA player Luka Dončić.

Critical reception
AllMusic praised the song, calling it "bouncy, sophomoric fun". Matthew Strauss of Pitchfork gave a more critical review of the song, writing, "...Harlow simply incorporates the global star's name into a refrain. The song's got nothing to do with Dua Lipa; again, it's the sort of knowing wink that makes for good tabloid fodder but not necessarily good music. Were it not called 'Dua Lipa,' there would be nothing of note about the song, which has a flat beat and equally flat bars." Comparing it to Harlow's song "Tyler Herro", Strauss wrote that "'Dua Lipa' is just being vaguely horny on main, as he might say."

Charts

Certifications

References

2022 songs
Jack Harlow songs
Songs written by Jack Harlow
Songs written by Rogét Chahayed
Trap music songs
Songs written by Federico Vindver
Dua Lipa